Jan Hendrik de Waal Malefijt (31 January 1852, Overveen, North Holland – 14 March 1931, Katwijk) was a Dutch politician.

Political functions
 City council of Zeist: 1884-1890
 Mayor of Westbroek: 1890-1903
 Mayor of Achttienhoven: 1890-1903
 States-Provincial of Utrecht: 1892-1909
 House of Representatives: 1897-1909
 Gedeputeerde staten of Utrecht: 1903-1909
 Minister of Colonial Affairs: 1909-1913
 Mayor of Katwijk: 1914-1927
 States-Provincial of South-Holland: 1916-1917
 Senate: 1917-1925

1852 births
1931 deaths
People from Bloemendaal
Anti-Revolutionary Party politicians
Ministers of Colonial Affairs of the Netherlands
Reformed Churches Christians from the Netherlands
Municipal councillors of Zeist
Mayors in Utrecht (province)
Mayors in South Holland
People from Katwijk
Members of the Provincial-Executive of Utrecht
Members of the Provincial Council of Utrecht
Members of the Provincial Council of South Holland
Members of the House of Representatives (Netherlands)
Members of the Senate (Netherlands)